Joe Brown (born 14 January 1999) is an English rugby league footballer who plays as a  or  for the York Knights in the Betfred Championship.

Background
Brown was born in Bradford, West Yorkshire, England. He was brought up in the youth system at the Bulls, making him a product of the Bradford Bulls Academy, until he signed for Wigan's academy in 2017.

However he re-signed with his former club Bradford in May 2019 for the first team on an 18-month contract.

Bradford Bulls
2019 - 2019 Season

Brown made his debut in the 2019 RFL 1895 Cup Round 2 against Barrow. He then featured in Round 22 against York City before picking up an injury.

2020 - 2020 Season

Brown featured in the pre-season friendlies against the Castleford Tigers, Leeds, Dewsbury and York City. He scored two tries against Castleford.

Brown featured in Round 1 against the London Broncos to Round 5 Sheffield. He also featured in the 2020 Challenge Cup from Round 4 against the Underbank Rangers to Round 5 Wakefield Trinity.

At the end of the season, Brown signed a one-year extension to stay at Bradford.

2021 - 2021 Season

Brown featured in the pre-season friendly against Swinton. Brown featured in Round 1 against Sheffield to Round 9 against the Featherstone Rovers then in Round 11 Widnes to Round 18 Swinton. He also featured in Round 20 against Toulouse Olympique to Elimination Playoff Batley. Brown also played in the 2021 Challenge Cup in Round 1 against Featherstone.

Statistics
Statistics do not include pre-season friendlies.

References

External links
Profile at bradfordbulls.co.uk

1999 births
Living people
Bradford Bulls players
English rugby league players
Rugby league second-rows
Rugby league fullbacks
Rugby league five-eighths
Rugby league players from Bradford
York City Knights players